Ranunculus papulentus, commonly known as the large river buttercup, is a buttercup that is endemic to south-eastern Australia.

Description
The large river buttercup is an upright perennial herb 10–25 cm in height with underground stolons. The flowering stems are slender and erect, 3–30 cm in height. It has 2-4 flowers with spreading, glossy yellow petals.

It has leaves with lamina 2–4 cm long.  The three primary segments each have 3–5 lobes or teeth, or are rarely entire.  The petiole is usually 4–25 cm long.  The petals are 7–12 mm long and 2–4 mm wide. The nectary lobes are elliptical or semicircular.  It usually has 12–36 achenes, 1.7–3.6 mm long, with the lateral faces irregularly wrinkled or pitted, or rarely smooth, and when mature often pale and thickened along the dorsal ridge.

Distribution and habitat
It has been recorded from New South Wales, Victoria, South Australia and the Australian Capital Territory.  It occurs in freshwater wetland environments, on mud or in pools.

Biology and ecology
Flowering may occur from spring to autumn.  The plant has a rhizomatous habit which aids its spread.

References

Notes

Sources
 
 

Flora of Australia
papulentus